Andes is a hamlet and census-designated place (CDP) in Delaware County, New York, United States. The population was 252 at the 2010 census. It was formerly a village.

Andes is located on Route 28 and is the only significant community in the town of Andes.

History 
The village was almost destroyed by a fire in 1878.

It is the location of the Andes Historic District and Andes Railroad Station, both listed on the National Register of Historic Places.

During a special village election on June 3, 2002, the residents approved the dissolution of the village by a vote of 81 to 63. On December 31, 2003, the incorporated village of Andes ceased to exist.

Geography
The hamlet of Andes is located in the northern part of the town of Andes at  (42.1886976, -74.7857138). New York Route 28 leads northwest  to Delhi, the Delaware County seat, and southeast  to Margaretville.

Demographics

As of the census of 2000, there were 289 people, 132 households, and 76 families residing in the village. The population density was 253.1 per square mile (97.9/km2). There were 161 housing units at an average density of 141.0/sq mi (54.5/km2). The racial makeup of the village was 96.89% White, 0.69% Black or African American, 0.35% Asian, 1.73% from other races, and 0.35% from two or more races. Hispanic or Latino of any race were 3.11% of the population.

There were 132 households, out of which 22.7% had children under the age of 18 living with them, 46.2% were married couples living together, 6.1% had a female householder with no husband present, and 42.4% were non-families. 37.9% of all households were made up of individuals, and 21.2% had someone living alone who was 65 years of age or older. The average household size was 2.19 and the average family size was 2.87.

In the village, the population was spread out, with 18.7% under the age of 18, 10.7% from 18 to 24, 25.6% from 25 to 44, 22.1% from 45 to 64, and 22.8% who were 65 years of age or older. The median age was 42 years. For every 100 females, there were 114.1 males. For every 100 females age 18 and over, there were 115.6 males.

The median income for a household in the village was $32,857, and the median income for a family was $47,500. Males had a median income of $28,281 versus $23,333 for females. The per capita income for the village was $22,716. About 6.8% of families and 7.6% of the population were below the poverty line, including 3.6% of those under the age of eighteen and 2.7% of those 65 or over.

Media coverage
Andes was the subject of a 2009 opinion piece in The New York Times and a 2011 article in the New York Post.

References

Hamlets in New York (state)
Census-designated places in New York (state)
Census-designated places in Delaware County, New York
Former villages in New York (state)
Populated places disestablished in 2003
Hamlets in Delaware County, New York